Jessy De Smet, whose stage name is Jessy (born 8 July 1976, Zottegem, Belgium), is a Belgian dance music singer of Flemish origin. who had several gold records in the late 1990s and 2000s.

She started her career in 1995 as a member of Belgian dance act The Mackenzie ft. Jessy. They had a number of hits and won a TMF Award for best album in 1998 with Angel. "Innocence", "All I Need" and "Alive" were the biggest hit singles. In 2001, Jessy decided to leave The Mackenzie and go solo.

In 2002, she released her solo record Rain, produced by Regi Penxten, the man behind the popular group Milk Inc.  The single "Look at Me Now" became a hit in Belgium and the UK, and launched her solo career. After this success, she worked with international acts, such as Verheyen & Vanvaeck, Sash!, Linda (Milk Inc), DJ Rebel, Michael Beltran and Mickey Modelle. Modelle launched her back into the UK Singles Chart with a reworked version of "Dancing in the Dark".

In 2011, Jessy released a greatest hits compilation, The Ultimate Jessy – Best Of 1995–2012, including the new single "Angel" with the American rapper Kaliq Scott.

In 2012, she released "Innocence '12", a remake of her signature song that launched her career in the 1990s. It featured the Belgian urban artist, Abie Flinston, and was produced by Penxten.

In 2015, she released "Glorious", her last dance-album. She wants to experiment with other genres and release something totally different by the end of 2016 ...

Discography

Albums
Angel (With The Mackenzie) – No. 1 (BEL)
Rain – No. 46 (BEL)
The Ultimate Jessy – Best Of 1995–2012 – No. 33 (BEL)
Glorious – No. 47 (BEL)

Singles

With The Mackenzie
"I Am Free" – No. 26 (BEL)
"Arpegia (Without You)"
"Love" / "You Got To Get Up"
"Innocence" – No. 6 (BEL)
"Falling in Love" – No. 4 (BEL)
"Alive" – No. 7 (BEL)
"Out Of Control" – No. 10 (BEL)
"The Rain" – No. 12 (BEL)
"Emotions" – No. 23 (BEL)
"Be My Lover" – No. 25 (BEL)
"For You" – No. 20 (BEL)
"All I Need" – No. 6 (BEL), No. 49 (NED)
"Walk Away" – No. 25 (BEL)

Solo
"Look at Me Now" – No.8 (BEL), No. 50 (NED)
"Enchanted" (Promo Only)
"Regardez-moi"
"Head Over Heels" – No. 11 (BEL)
"How Long (Point Of No Return)" – No. 19 (BEL)
"Silent Tears" – No. 14 (BEL)
"Dancing in the Dark" (First Release) – No. 41 (BEL)
"I'll Get Over You" (Promo Only)
"Getting Out" (with Linda) – No. 45 (BEL)
"Stop The Game"
"Please Forgive Me" (Australia / Japan EP)
"Missing" (2010) – No. 16 (BEL)
"Another Me" (Feat. Regi)
"Please Forgive Me" (Europe EP)
"Angel" (Feat. Kaliq Scott & Rebel) – No. 35 (BEL)
"Innocence '12" (Feat. Abie Flinstone) – No. 7 (BEL)
"Impossible" (Feat. Ian Prada) – No. 25 (BEL)
"Nothing at All" – No. 10 (BEL)
"Bring Me Back To Life (Wolfpack Edit)" – No. 30 (BEL)
"Beautiful (Candidate Song For Belgium in Eurovision)" – No. 22 (BEL)
"Stars" – No. 47 (BEL)
"Flay Away"

With Michael Beltran
"Can't Get Enough" – No. 15 (BEL)
"Can't Get Enough (DJ Dominique Mixes)"

With Micky Modelle

With Sash!
"All Is Love" (2010) – No. 16 (BEL)
"No Love" (2013)

With DJ Rebel
"Think About the Way" (2011) – No. 37 (BEL)

With X-Tof
"Move Your Body" (2011) – No. 34 (BEL)

With Dennis
"Missing" (2012) – No. 28 (BEL)

With DJ Frank
"Salvation" (2014) – No. 35 (BEL)

References

External links
 Official website

1976 births
Living people
Smet, Jessy De
People from Zottegem
Flemish musicians
21st-century Belgian women singers
21st-century Belgian singers